is a Japanese action drama film directed by Tetsuo Shinohara depicting an Imperial Japanese Navy submarine battling a United States Navy destroyer near the end of World War II.

Plot
The story alternates between the past and present, linked by a fateful song. During World War II, Japanese submarine I-77 battles an American destroyer off the coast of Okinawa. Before heading to war, the captain received a final present from his lover, the score to a song titled Manatsu no Orion. Sixty-four years later, his granddaughter discovers the score and the significance behind the song.

Cast
 Hiroshi Tamaki as Takayuki Kuramoto
 Keiko Kitagawa as Shizuko Arisawa / Izumi Kuramoto
 Yoshikuni Dōchin as Yoshihiko Arisawa
 Mitsuru Fukikoshi as Hiroshi Nakatsu
 Yuta Hiraoka as Makoto Tsubota
 Masaya Kikawada as Hajime Toyama
 Taiga as Katsumi Suzuki

See also
 Das Boot
 Submarine films
 Battle of the Atlantic (1939–1945)
 The Cruel Sea

References

External links
 
 
 Last Operations Under the Orion at Japanese Cinema Database 
 Battle under Orion at Toho Global Site 
 Battle under Orion at Japanese Film Database

2009 films
World War II submarine films
Films directed by Tetsuo Shinohara
Films set in the 1940s
Japanese war drama films
Films scored by Taro Iwashiro
Toho films
Japanese World War II films
2000s Japanese films